This is a list of fairfly species within the genus Polynema.

Polynema species 

 Polynema abdominale 
 Polynema acutiventre 
 Polynema aequicoloratum 
 Polynema albicorne 
 Polynema albicoxa 
 Polynema albitarse 
 Polynema aligherini 
 Polynema altitudine 
 Polynema anantanagana 
 Polynema anceps 
 Polynema antoniae 
 Polynema ara 
 Polynema arcticum 
 Polynema areolatum 
 Polynema aristokratka 
 Polynema aspidioti 
 Polynema assamense 
 Polynema aterrimum 
 Polynema atractoura 
 Polynema atratum 
 Polynema atrosimile 
 Polynema atrum 
 Polynema auricorpus 
 Polynema auripedicellatum 
 Polynema australiense 
 Polynema bakkendorfi 
 Polynema baronessa 
 Polynema bergi 
 Polynema bimaculatipenne 
 Polynema bischoffi 
 Polynema bitashimwae 
 Polynema blackbourni 
 Polynema boreum 
 Polynema brevicarinae 
 Polynema breviscapus 
 Polynema brittanum 
 Polynema caesariatipenne 
 Polynema calceatiscapus 
 Polynema capillatum 
 Polynema carbonelli 
 Polynema carpaticum 
 Polynema ciliatum 
 Polynema clotho 
 Polynema collaris 
 Polynema crassa 
 Polynema darwini 
 Polynema decoloratum 
 Polynema devriesi 
 Polynema dhenkunde 
 Polynema draperi 
 Polynema editha 
 Polynema elatum 
 Polynema elegantissimum 
 Polynema elongatum 
 Polynema enchenopae 
 Polynema euchariforme 
 Polynema eucharis 
 Polynema eurydice 
 Polynema eutettexi 
 Polynema fennicosimile 
 Polynema fennicum 
 Polynema filicorne 
 Polynema flavipes 
 Polynema florum 
 Polynema foersteri 
 Polynema franklini 
 Polynema frater 
 Polynema fulmeki 
 Polynema fumipenne 
 Polynema fuscipes 
 Polynema gallica 
 Polynema gargarae 
 Polynema gigas 
 Polynema giraulti 
 Polynema glabricorpus 
 Polynema globosiventris 
 Polynema gracile 
 Polynema gracilior 
 Polynema graculus 
 Polynema grotiusi 
 Polynema haeckeli 
 Polynema halidayi 
 Polynema hebe 
 Polynema hegeli 
 Polynema helena 
 Polynema helochaeta 
 Polynema howardii 
 Polynema hundsheimense 
 Polynema hyalinipenne 
 Polynema illustre 
 Polynema imitatrix 
 Polynema imperatrix 
 Polynema inconsuetum 
 Polynema jassidarum 
 Polynema joulei 
 Polynema kamathi 
 Polynema koroleva 
 Polynema kressbachi 
 Polynema lansi 
 Polynema latior 
 Polynema latipectoris 
 Polynema latissimum 
 Polynema lodgei 
 Polynema longicauda 
 Polynema longigaster 
 Polynema longior 
 Polynema longipectoris 
 Polynema longipennatum 
 Polynema longipes 
 Polynema longum 
 Polynema loriger 
 Polynema lucidum 
 Polynema luteolum 
 Polynema maculipes 
 Polynema magniceps 
 Polynema maidli 
 Polynema malkwitzi 
 Polynema marginatum 
 Polynema marilandicum 
 Polynema markiza 
 Polynema mboroense 
 Polynema medicae 
 Polynema megacephala 
 Polynema mendeleefi 
 Polynema mendeli 
 Polynema microptera 
 Polynema modestum 
 Polynema mundum 
 Polynema mymaripennis 
 Polynema nativum 
 Polynema needhami 
 Polynema neofuscipes 
 Polynema neopusillum 
 Polynema neorectum 
 Polynema neustadti 
 Polynema nigriceps 
 Polynema nordaui 
 Polynema notabilissimum 
 Polynema novickyi 
 Polynema oreades 
 Polynema ovatum 
 Polynema ovulorum 
 Polynema pallidipenne 
 Polynema pallidum 
 Polynema palustre 
 Polynema parvipennis 
 Polynema parvipetiolatum 
 Polynema pax 
 Polynema pechlaneri 
 Polynema pellucens 
 Polynema pennicilipennis 
 Polynema perforator 
 Polynema permagnum 
 Polynema pernigripes 
 Polynema phaseoli 
 Polynema picea 
 Polynema picipes 
 Polynema pilipennis 
 Polynema pilosum 
 Polynema poeta 
 Polynema poincarei 
 Polynema polonicum 
 Polynema polychromum 
 Polynema pratensiphagum 
 Polynema princessa 
 Polynema prolongatum 
 Polynema protractum 
 Polynema pulchricoloris 
 Polynema pulchrum 
 Polynema pusilloides 
 Polynema pusillum 
 Polynema pyrophila 
 Polynema quadricaput 
 Polynema quadripetiolatum 
 Polynema quadruplex 
 Polynema rangatira 
 Polynema rectosimile 
 Polynema rectum 
 Polynema reticulatum 
 Polynema richmondense 
 Polynema romanesi 
 Polynema rousseaui 
 Polynema rubriventris 
 Polynema ruficolle 
 Polynema rufonigrum 
 Polynema ruschkai 
 Polynema ruymbekei 
 Polynema sachtlebeni 
 Polynema saga 
 Polynema sagittaria 
 Polynema sappho 
 Polynema schmitzi 
 Polynema schulzewsky 
 Polynema schumanni 
 Polynema scrutator 
 Polynema secundobreve 
 Polynema seychellense 
 Polynema shakespearei 
 Polynema sibylla 
 Polynema sieboldi 
 Polynema signum 
 Polynema silvae 
 Polynema silvifilia 
 Polynema solare 
 Polynema speciosissimum 
 Polynema speciosum 
 Polynema spectabile 
 Polynema spenceri 
 Polynema stammeri 
 Polynema striaticorne 
 Polynema stubaiense 
 Polynema stupendum 
 Polynema sublestum 
 Polynema synophropsis 
 Polynema tantalea 
 Polynema tenue 
 Polynema tenuiforme 
 Polynema tenuisimile 
 Polynema thoreauini 
 Polynema triscia 
 Polynema umbrosum 
 Polynema unicolor 
 Polynema uroxys 
 Polynema valkenburgense 
 Polynema vallis 
 Polynema varians 
 Polynema victoria 
 Polynema virgilii 
 Polynema wagneri 
 Polynema wallacei 
 Polynema waterhousei 
 Polynema weyeri 
 Polynema woodi 
 Polynema zangwilli 
 Polynema zetes 
 Polynema zolai

References 

Lists of insect species
Mymaridae